CeReFiM (Center for Research in Finance and Management) is a research center attached to the University of Namur in Belgium. Research at the CeReFiM focuses on finance and management practices. The current head of the CeReFiM is Pr. Pierre Giot.

External links 
 CeReFiM
 The University of Namur

Research institutes in Belgium
Universities in Belgium